Jost de Jager (born March 7, 1965) is a German business consultant, politician and former Schleswig-Holstein Minister of Science, Economic Affairs and Transport.

Personal Life and Education 
De Jager lives with his family in Eckernförde.

Between 1987 and 1994, he studied history, English studies and Politics at the University of Kiel.

Career 

De Jager worked as a volunteer at the evangelical press service in Kiel between 1994 and 1996.

He was a member of the Schleswig-Holstein Landtag for the Christian Democratic Union (CDU) between 1996 and 2005 and became his factions spokesman on European politics in 1996. From 1998 to 2002, he was his factions spokesman on education.

In 2005, De Jager was appointed State Secretary to the Schleswig-Holstein Ministry of Science, Economic Affairs and Transport until he was appointed Minister of Science, Economic Affairs and Transport by Peter Harry Carstensen on October 27, 2009. De Jager was made his party's lead candidate for the 2012 Schleswig-Holstein State Elections in which his party lost to the Social Democrats. He was subsequently succeeded as Minister by Reinhard Meyer (Economic Affairs and Transport) and Waltraud Wende (Science).

References 

Ministers of the Schleswig-Holstein State Government
Living people
Schleswig-Holstein
Members of the Landtag of Schleswig-Holstein
20th-century German politicians
21st-century German politicians
Politicians from Schleswig-Holstein
1965 births